Schinos (Greek: Σχίνος) may refer to several villages in Greece:

 Schinos, a village near Agrinio, Aetolia-Acarnania
Schinos, Corinthia, a village